KSM may refer to:
 Kernel same-page merging, sharing identical computer memory pages among processes
 Khalid Sheikh Mohammed, terrorist held at Guantanamo Bay
 Kothagudem School of Mines, later University College of Engineering, Kakatiya University, India
 Kommando Spezialkräfte Marine, special forces of the German Navy
   or Communist Youth Union, the youth wing of the Communist Party of Bohemia and Moravia
 Kerr Sulphurets Mitchell, an active mine exploration project in British Columbia
 KSM (band), an American all girl rock band
 KPH (radio station),  by alternative callsign
 St. Mary's Airport (Alaska), by airport code
 Kosmos Airlines, by airline code
 KSM, a series of microphones by Shure